Joseph Morgan (fl. 1739) was a British historical compiler.

Works
Morgan edited a periodical Phoenix Britannicus, being a miscellaneous Collection of scarce and curious Tracts… interspersed with choice pieces from original MSS., from January 1732. It ran for six numbers, republished in one volume, with dedication to Charles Lennox, 2nd Duke of Richmond. Other works included:

Mahometism Fully Explained (1723) 
Mahometism Explained (1725). These two were in part based on a manuscript of 1603 by Muhammad Rabadan of Aragon.
 The History of Algiers (1728–9)
 The Lives and Memorable Actions of many Illustrious Persons of the Eastern Nations (1739), based partly on papers of George Sale.

He also made some translations from French and Dutch.

Notes

 
Attribution
 

18th-century British people
British historians
British translators
British magazine editors